166th meridian may refer to:

166th meridian east, a line of longitude east of the Greenwich Meridian
166th meridian west, a line of longitude west of the Greenwich Meridian